Heroes of Wrestling was a professional wrestling pay-per-view (PPV) event that took place on October 10, 1999 from the Casino Magic hotel and casino in Bay St. Louis, Mississippi. The event was meant to be the first in a series of pay-per-views that would feature popular wrestling stars from the 1980s and early 1990s. 

Plans for the franchise were abandoned following the event, which suffered from a poor buy rate and several controversies, most notably a disastrous main event featuring an extremely inebriated Jake Roberts who teamed up with  Yokozuna in the main event, only to lose to Jim Neidhart and King Kong Bundy in a tag team match.

Production
Playing off the resurgence in popularity of pro wrestling at the time, Fosstone Productions president Bill Stone conceived a series of events consisting of wrestling stars from the 1980s and early 1990s fighting one another in a series of "dream matches". He expressed his surprise that the World Wrestling Federation had not already put on such an event. Stone intended to run three more pay-per-views, run on a quarterly basis, if an initial target of 40,000 buys was reached. 

Recruitment of wrestlers began in May 1999. Sid Vicious was one of the first to be approached, and he recruited Michael Lombardi, promoter of Northeast Wrestling in New York, to act as booker. However, Sid was signed exclusively by World Championship Wrestling in June of that year, and so did not appear. Vader, Terry Funk, Bam Bam Bigelow and the Honky Tonk Man were all approached, but declined. Additionally, Nick Bockwinkel was advertised but did not appear. Due to WWF-owned trademarks, Yokozuna and The Bushwhackers were referred to with the affix "former" in all advertising.

A match was planned involving 2 Cold Scorpio and Reckless Youth, in order to break up the slower matches with fast-paced action. However, Youth was signed to a WWF developmental deal in the interim and was replaced by Julio Fantastico. Julio has cited his appearance on the show as allowing him to obtain more bookings and to connect with more established wrestlers.

Reception and controversy

Although the event was heavily promoted, it was only purchased by 29,000 households. Additionally, the event itself was generally regarded to be of poor quality: Wrestling Observer rated it the worst major wrestling event of 1999, with its editor Dave Meltzer giving a rating of "absolute zero" to a tag team match featuring Luke Williams and Butch Miller facing The Iron Sheik and Nikolai Volkoff. Meltzer's colleague, Bryan Alvarez of Figure Four Weekly, has repeatedly referred to this match as the worst he has ever seen and rated it "minus more stars than there are in the universe".

Color commentary 
Minor controversy initially erupted at the beginning of the broadcast due to a last-minute change of commentators. Gordon Solie, a well-respected figure in the wrestling world with several decades of experience delivering play-by-play, had been advertised as one of the event's commentators. Shortly before the event, Solie fell ill with throat cancer to which he would succumb nine months later. No announcement was made of the change before the show, and neither Solie nor his illness were ever mentioned during the broadcast. Solie's replacement, Randy Rosenbloom, appeared to have little to no knowledge of professional wrestling, delivering what would come to be regarded as some of the poorest color commentary ever given at a professional wrestling event. Rosenbloom repeatedly made mistakes during the broadcast, such as misidentifying wrestlers' countries of origin, and having to be repeatedly corrected on basic wrestling terminology by his broadcast partners Dutch Mantell and Captain Lou Albano, such as when he called an arm drag performed by Marty Jannetty a "reverse slam takedown". A particular source of criticism was Rosenbloom's inability to identify a simple dropkick, repeatedly calling the maneuver such things as a "flying kick," "flying leg kick," and "leg drop".

Jake Roberts incident 
The show was originally booked to conclude with a double main event pitting Jake Roberts against Jim Neidhart, followed by King Kong Bundy against Yokozuna. Roberts' problems with drug and alcohol addiction had been well publicized in the preceding years, and his booking in the main event was meant to capitalize on the resurgence in popularity he had enjoyed as a result of his attempts at sobriety. Roberts' return to the ring was meant to be the high point of the evening, and the match responsible for generating the most publicity. However, Roberts suffered a relapse prior to the show and consumed a significant amount of alcohol before arriving. Prior to his match with Neidhart, Roberts had been scheduled to cut a promo in which he would taunt Neidhart. Due to his level of intoxication, Roberts' promo instead consisted of a slurred, incoherent rant consisting largely of wordplay based on the event's casino setting. One particular segment of the rant would go viral after it was posted on WrestleCrap:

You don't want to play cards with me because I'll cheat. Okay? I cheat. You wanna play 21? I've got 22. You want to play blackjack? I've got two of those, too! You wanna play ... Aces and eights, baby? I got too many of those, too!

After the interview, Roberts staggered to the ring with his trademark snake. However, upon reaching the ring, Roberts put the snake down and attempted to return backstage; he then reversed course, returned to ringside, and began greeting fans. Before entering the ring, Roberts grabbed a female fan and had her rub her hands on his bare chest. Later, Roberts removed the snake from its bag and simulated masturbation with it. The event's producers cut to wide-shots of the crowd during the incident, so that at-home viewers were unaware what was happening in the ring. Roberts eventually collapsed in the middle of the ring with the snake draped over his body; the supine Roberts then began to attempt to kiss the snake.

In an effort to salvage the match, promoter Bill Stone decided on the fly to combine the main events into one tag team event and sent Bundy to team with Neidhart and Yokozuna to team with Roberts. Stone then sent a member of the production crew, Michael Henry, to ringside to consult with the wrestlers. There was no finish planned for this match, as none of the wrestlers involved was willing to take a fall; Bundy and Yokozuna had even had it written into their contracts that they could not be pinned or submit.

Bundy pinned Roberts by hitting him with a splash after Roberts had staggered and fallen around the ring several times, despite Roberts not being the legal man in the ring. Yokozuna and Henry attempted to salvage the event and Roberts' reputation by trying to goad Roberts into attacking Henry, making his behavior appear scripted. Roberts was too inebriated to realize what was happening and remained oblivious to Yokozuna and Henry's attacks. Yokozuna then hit a Samoan drop on Henry to make the entire series of events appear scripted; while Yokozuna attacked Henry, Roberts began to disrobe in the middle of the ring and the producers cut the feed immediately thereafter.

Roberts' promo twenty years later would become the subject of his future professional wrestling storylines.  In 2019, Roberts, by now having been sober as a result of Diamond Dallas Page and other wrestlers' work (and ironically the only wrestler from the disastrous main event still alive after the deaths of the other participants), played off the promo at AEW All Out, where in Road to All Out promos, he played a card dealer dealing cards to female wrestlers in the battle royale match, billed as a "Casino Battle Royale," where wrestlers arrive based on which suit of cards they have delivered to them.

Results

Other on-air talent
Randy Rosenbloom (commentator)
Dutch Mantel (commentator)
Captain Lou Albano (commissioner)
Crisper Stanford (in-ring announcer) 
Michael St. John (backstage interviewer)

See also
 King of the Ring (1994), a wrestling pay-per-view which is also noted for its guest commentator
 Victory Road (2011), a wrestling pay-per-view where a wrestler in the main event suffered from inebriation
 Hart Legacy Wrestling, a wrestling promotion which suffered several controversies

References

External links
So Bad... So Very Bad...
The SmarK Retro Repost - Heroes Of Wrestling
The Furious Flashbacks - Heroes Of Wrestling
Complete Heroes Of Wrestling PPV Results
Review at Slam Wrestling
Complete coverage at DDT Digest
A 20-year retrospective article on Heroes of Wrestling at The Wrestling Estate

Professional wrestling shows
1999 in professional wrestling
Events in Mississippi
Professional wrestling controversies
1999 in Mississippi
Professional wrestling in Mississippi